Sphodromantis kersteni is a species of praying mantis found in Kenya, Tanzania, and Sudan.

See also
African mantis
List of mantis genera and species
Follow more important articles

References

kersteni
Mantodea of Africa
Insects described in 1869